Malaya Karpovka is a rural locality (a village) in Denisovskoye Rural Settlement, Gorokhovetsky District, Vladimir Oblast, Russia. The population was 1 as of 2010.

Geography 
Malaya Karpovka is located 19 km southwest of Gorokhovets (the district's administrative centre) by road. Murakovo is the nearest rural locality.

References 

Rural localities in Gorokhovetsky District